Charlton v. Kelly, 229 U.S. 447 (1913), is a case pertaining to extradition of a U.S. citizen to Italy. In 1910, Porter Charlton confessed in New York to having murdered his wife in Italy. The Italian vice consul requested Charlton's extradition. Hon. John A. Blair, one of the judges of the Circuit Court of the United States for the district of New Jersey, suspended Charlton's petition for a writ of habeas corpus and a warrant was issued for his arrest. This order for extradition was approved by Secretary of State Philander C. Knox.

Opinion of the Court
In an opinion written by Justice Horace Harmon Lurton, the Court held that the United States had the right to waive a breach of its extradition treaty with Italy, and by waiving the breach, the countries would remain bound by the treaty.

See also
List of United States Supreme Court cases, volume 229

References

External links
 
 
 Lawyers' Reports Annotated entry on Charlton v. Kelly on Google Books

1913 in United States case law
United States Supreme Court cases
Extradition case law
United States Supreme Court cases of the White Court